The Muir Army Airfield  is a military airport at Fort Indiantown Gap, near Annville, Pennsylvania, United States. It is home to the Eastern Army National Guard Aviation Training Site (EAATS), operated by the Pennsylvania Army National Guard. The airfield has one active runway designated 7/25 with a  asphalt surface.

History
Muir Army Airfield was established as an airstrip in the 1930s and was originally the central parade ground and emergency landing field of the Fort Indiantown Gap military reservation. On July 12, 1941, the first airplane piloted by Major Edgar Scattergood, Air Office of the 28th Infantry Division, landed on the newly dedicated Muir Field. The 3200 x 100 foot runway was of good size for fixed-wing aircraft at the time; however, the Army Corps of Engineers built the runway in a northeast-southwest direction. The prevailing wind blows out of the mountains from the northwest, so there is usually a permanent crosswind during normal weather conditions.

The airfield was named in honor of Major General Charles H. Muir, the Commanding General of the 28th Division during World War I.

Units 
 Combat Aviation Brigade, 28th Infantry Division
 Headquarters and Headquarters Company (HHC) 
 2d Battalion (General Support), 104th Aviation Regiment (2-104th GSAB)
 628th Aviation Support Battalion (628th ASB)

Eastern Army National Guard Training Site
EAATS was established in by the United States Army in 1981 and focuses on utility and cargo missions, specifically conducting Sikorsky UH-60 Black Hawk, Eurocopter UH-72 Lakota, and Boeing CH-47 Chinook qualifications for pilots, instructor pilots, and maintenance test pilots, as well as enlisted maintainers and crewmembers. The 28th Expeditionary Combat Aviation Brigade, headquartered at Muir Army Airfield, provides all the maintenance support for EAATS.

Statistics
Muir Army Airfield currently accommodates 75 helicopters and three fixed-wing aircraft, conducting about 70,000 take-offs and landings annually, making it the second busiest helicopter base in the world.

See also
List of United States Army airfields
United States Army Aviation Center of Excellence

References

External links
 EAATS (official site)

 Muir Army Airfield and EAATS profile from GlobalSecurity.org

Airports in Lebanon County, Pennsylvania
Pennsylvania National Guard
United States Army airfields